Naubatpur is a satellite town in Patna Metropolitan Region located inside Patna district within the Indian state of Bihar.

Geography 
It is located 15 km west of Patna. The nearest airport is the Patna Airport, 18.5km NorthEast of the town.

History

Naubatpur is a small suburb on the south-west outskirts of Patna, Bihar. This small locality is surrounded by agricultural lands and orchards. Due to new upcoming projects such as UB Group Beer Factory, National Highway 139,78 and All India Institute of Medical Science at Phulwari Sharif, people are moving their profession from agriculture to business and service sectors. There are many small villages attached with this small city. In coming years this area becomes more populated because of AIIMS of Phulwari Sharif and other agriculture sectors. Naubatpur is one of the biggest blocks in entire Patna with maximum number of Panchayat. Birthplace of renowned BJP Politician Mr. Ram Janam Sharma. It has one of the famous ancient math known as Taret-Pali Sthan Headed by Shri Shri 1008 Shudarshna Chari Maharaj ji. Naubatpur has seen many renaissance in terms of social upliftment and Political. Played Pivotal role in Bikram Vidhansabha and Patna West Constituency.

Schools and colleges 
(partial list)
 Kids Home School
 Cambridge Public School
 Sai Sadhna School
 Maltidhari College 
 Gyan Bharti Educational complex
 Jagdeo Memorial High School (Arap)

List of villages
The list of villages in Naubatpur Block (under Danapur Tehsil) is as follows:
 Adla
 Ajwan
 Badi Tenglaila
 Bara
 Chak Chechoul
 Chesi
 Chirora
 Dariyapur
 Dewra
 Faridpur
 Ganawan
 Ibrahimpur
 Jaitipur
 Jamalpura
 Karanja Gowai
 Khajuri
 Nawdiha
 Nawhi
 Savar Chak

References

Cities and towns in Patna district